Andrew J. Salata (July 11, 1900 – July 1983) was a professional football player-coach with the Orange Tornadoes and later the Newark Tornadoes, of the National Football League. In 1930, the Tornadoes moved to Newark from Orange, New Jersey. The team then hired Salata and Jack Fish to serve  as co-coaches. Neither man had ever coached in the NFL before. Under the two coaches the Tornadoes were 1-11, to finish last in the league.

References

1900 births
1983 deaths
Players of American football from Pennsylvania
Pittsburgh Panthers football players
Orange Tornadoes players
Newark Tornadoes players
Orange Tornadoes coaches